Flexal mammarenavirus (also known as the Flexal virus or FLEV, and previously known by the laboratory code BeAn 293022) is a mammarenavirus: an arenavirus with a mammalian host. It was first found in semiaquatic rodents of the genus Oryzomys in tropical forest in the Pará area of Brazil.

It is a member of Clade A of the Tacaribe (or "New World") serocomplex of the family Arenaviridae. Laboratory workers infected by Flexal virus have exhibited febrile illness.Flexal virus is listed as a UN 2814 Category A infectious substance.

References

External links 
 https://www.ncbi.nlm.nih.gov/nuccore/AF512831
 https://wwwn.cdc.gov/arbocat/VirusDetails.aspx?ID=148&SID=7

Arenaviridae
Viral diseases